Lord Henry William Scott-Bentinck (9 June 1804 – 31 December 1870), known as Lord Henry Bentinck, was a British Conservative Party politician.

Background
Bentinck was the third son of William Bentinck, 4th Duke of Portland, and Henrietta, daughter of Major-General John Scott. William Cavendish-Scott-Bentinck, 5th Duke of Portland and Lord George Bentinck were his elder brothers.

Political career
Bentinck sat as Member of Parliament (MP) for North Nottinghamshire from 1846 to 1857. He was also a Trustee of the British Museum and a well-known hound man.

Despite being an advocate of the abolition of slavery, he nevertheless submitted an unsuccessful claim for £2,411, relating to 46 enslaved Africans on the L'amitie estate, Trinidad.

Personal life
Bentinck died in December 1870, aged 66.

References

External links 
 

1804 births
1870 deaths
Henry
Younger sons of dukes
Conservative Party (UK) MPs for English constituencies
UK MPs 1841–1847
UK MPs 1847–1852
UK MPs 1852–1857